Andrew Roettger, better known as Versatile, is an American record producer, songwriter, and remixer from New Jersey. Versatile is signed to BMG Publishing and has his own company Versatile Music LLC.

Versatile has produced and remixed for artists like Flo Milli, Chris Brown, Usher, Fabolous, Jay-Z, Maino, Ciara, Britney Spears, Method Man, Redman, Joe Budden, Pittsburgh Slim, Nelly, Nelly Furtado, amongst others.

Selected discography

References

External links
Discogs Versatile page

Year of birth missing (living people)
Living people
Record producers from New Jersey
Songwriters from New Jersey